Ludlow Racecourse is a thoroughbred horse racing venue located in Bromfield near Ludlow, Shropshire, England.

One of the oldest courses in the country Ludlow stages National Hunt racing however originally flat racing was held there.

The Hurdles course is just over one and a half miles round with 6 hurdles per circuit.

The 'Chase course is a shorter circuit of just over 1 mile and 3 furlongs. There are 9 fences per circuit with 6 plain fences, 2 open ditches and a water jump which is situated in front of the stands.

The B4365 crosses the racecourse at three points of the tracks and traffic is stopped when the course is in use. Other minor local roads also cross the track close to the racecourse stables and the Golf Club House.

The venue is located between the small villages of Bromfield and Stanton Lacy, just off the A49, at a place long known as the Old Field.

16 meetings are staged each year at the course running between early October and mid May.

Golf course
The area within the racing tracks is entirely occupied by the Ludlow Golf Club, one of the oldest golf clubs and courses in Shropshire, having been founded in 1889. The course was extensively remodelled by James Braid in 1922. The 18-hole course is 6,277 yards long and is a par 70 from the men's championship tees, and a 5534, par 71 from the ladies tees.

References

External links
Ludlow Racecourse (Official website)
Course guide on GG.COM
Course guide on At The Races

Horse racing venues in England
Sports venues in Shropshire
Sports venues completed in 1889
Golf clubs and courses in Shropshire
Ludlow
1889 establishments in England